M'Lord of the White Road is a 1923 British silent adventure film directed by Arthur Rooke and starring Victor McLaglen, Marjorie Hume and James Lindsay.

Cast
 Victor McLaglen as Lord Annerley / John  
 Marjorie Hume as Lady Glorie  
 James Lindsay as Sir Humphrey Clayville  
 Fred Wright as Master Peter  
 Mary Rorke as Lady Collingway  
 George Turner as Tom Brown  
 Bert Osborne as Greppletight  
 Bob Reed as Greenleaf  
 Bertie White as Bushworthy  
 Harry Newbold as Aylesbury

References

Bibliography
 Low, Rachael. History of the British Film, 1918-1929. George Allen & Unwin, 1971.

External links
 

1923 films
1923 adventure films
British adventure films
British silent feature films
Films directed by Arthur Rooke
British black-and-white films
1920s English-language films
1920s British films
Silent adventure films